Platycranus is a genus of mostly European capsid bugs in the tribe Orthotylini, erected by Franz Xaver Fieber in 1858.  The species P. bicolor has been recorded from the British Isles.

Species 
According to BioLib the following are included:
subgenus Genistocapsus Wagner, 1957
 Platycranus alkestis Linnavuori, 1999
 Platycranus bicolor (Douglas & Scott, 1868)
 Platycranus boreae Gogala, 2002
 Platycranus concii Tamanini, 1987
 Platycranus genistae Lindberg, 1948
 Platycranus jordii Günther, 2011
 Platycranus jurineae P.V. Putshkov, 1985
 Platycranus longicornis Wagner, 1955
 Platycranus metriorrhynchus Reuter, 1883
 Platycranus minutus Wagner, 1955
 Platycranus orientalis Linnavuori, 1965
 Platycranus pictus Wagner, 1963
 Platycranus remanei Wagner, 1955
 Platycranus rumelicus Simov, 2006
 Platycranus wagneri Carapezza, 1997
subgenus Platycranus Fieber, 1870
 Platycranus eckerleini Wagner, 1962
 Platycranus erberi Fieber, 1870 - type species
 Platycranus hartigi Wagner, 1951
 Platycranus jordanicus Linnavuori, 1984
 Platycranus lindbergi Wagner, 1954
 Platycranus putoni Reuter, 1879

References

External links
Images of P. bicolor at BritishBugs.org
 

Miridae genera
Hemiptera of Europe
Orthotylini